The San Francisco Patrol Special Police (SFPSP) is a private special police agency in San Francisco, California. Per current city code, the SFPSP patrols the streets of San Francisco and fixed locations, and also provides a range of other safety services as requested by private clients. The SFPSP is authorized in the San Francisco City Charter, but is not part of the San Francisco Police Department (SFPD).

The SFPSP is one of the oldest law enforcement agencies in the United States, having been founded in 1847 shortly before the California Gold Rush.  The SFPSP is credited for the first modern U.S. adaption of the community policing concept.

The SFPSP employs non-sworn private patrol officers, appointed and regulated by the San Francisco Police Commission after an initial background review by the SFPD. As of 2011, they employed approximately 40 officers, known as "Patrol Special Police Officers" or simply "Patrol Specials".

Services
The SFPSP provide a variety of services for private clients pursuant to a negotiated contract, including unlocking or securing doors to a business, conducting checks of residences or businesses, securing perimeters at burglar alarms, providing physical security, and security consultations. Patrol Specials concentrate on order maintenance, rapid response, and early intervention in quality-of-life matters. Their goal is to prevent disturbances from becoming expensive and serious crimes, and to relieve pressure on the public police.

Since 1994, Patrol Specials have operated with citizen's arrest powers. They have access to SFPD radio feeds and are trained annually for 24 hours of classroom instruction and twice on a shooting range, according to standards set by the Police Chief. Patrol Specials are not SFPD employees, nor do they earn city benefits or pensions; however, courts may consider them to be employees for specified purposes such as SFPD employment records.

Patrol Specials are assigned to patrol a district in a neighborhood. Patrol Specials are required, by tradition and practice, to respect and consider the distinct tenor and character of the neighborhood they are assigned to. They often attend merchant and resident meetings to listen to concerns or offer advice. Patrol Specials are intended to become trusted and valued members of neighborhoods, interacting with local residents and business owners.

SFPSP clients include merchants, professionals, homeowners' associations, residents, street fair organizers, non-profit organizations, and occasionally, government agencies who may outsource security. The typical hourly rate in 2010 for patrols averaged $50–60, including a patrol car. Additional services or more intense policing may entail an additional cost negotiated with each client.

SFPSP clients and the public are protected from negligent or intentional harm, because rules governing program rules require each beat owner to carry liability insurance that protects against potential negligence or injury by an officer. In addition, rules require each beat owner to carry workers' compensation insurance for employees. Each beat owner determines if they will fund a health and/or retirement plan for Assistant Patrol Special Police Officers.

The SFPSP has its own professional association. The force also has a professional support group, Special Neighborhood Policing, which operates a community outreach website.

History
The SFPSP was established as a citizen- and merchant-sponsored neighborhood police force in 1847, two years before the city established the SFPD, with the swearing-in of two police constables. In 1851, the city increased the force to 50 sworn officers. In 1857, the SFPSP was formalized in the City Charter. Presently, Section 4.127 of the City Charter governs the Patrol Special Police.

SFPSP and SFPD officers have historically cooperated in emergencies. Patrol Specials were called upon to assist SFPD officers during earthquakes such as the 1989 Loma Prieta earthquake. However, in 1994, with backing from the SFPD and the Police Officers Association, the Police Commission "stripped the Patrol Specials of their status as peace officers with the ability to issue citations and book their own arrests." The SFPSP's numbers plummeted from approximately 250 Patrol Specials to just 18, employing fewer than two dozen assistants. "They're killing us by attrition," said Jane Warner, president of the association that represents the specials.

A fall 2009 survey of SFPSP clients, conducted by San Jose State University Associate Professor of Economics Dr. Edward P. Stringham, found that clients consistently approved of Patrol Specials, stating they felt they improved their neighborhoods and made them safer. Clients reported Patrol Specials were consistently professional and courteous, understood residential life and the neighborhood, and responded quickly and effectively to concerns that the SFPD was unlikely to address.

Logs of daily activities were introduced in 2010 on the officers' support group website, as a form of increased transparency between the SFPSP and the public.

Appointment and program regulation
Patrol Special Police Officers and Assistant Officers are duly appointed by the San Francisco Police Commission, an appointed body of seven civilians which has oversight responsibility for the SFPD and SFPSP.

The Interim Rules and Procedures for Patrol Special Officers and Their Assistants ("The Rules"), promulgated by the Police Commission in December 2008, require that Patrol Specials pass an initial background check conducted by the SFPD. Officers receive 24 hours of annual training in the classroom and twice on the range according to standards determined by the Police Chief. Before going on patrol, Patrol Specials check in with the duty watch commander in their police district.

The Rules authorize their uniform and patch, which are distinct from that of the SFPD. Patrol Specials wear a patch on their uniform that identifies their force by name on a band at the top, as shown above. The lettering and trim of the patch is embroidered in silver thread. Officers wear a silver-toned six-point star with the words "San Francisco Patrol Special Police". A Patrol Special's uniform, firearm, baton, and patrol car are not paid for with taxpayer funds and must be purchased privately.

In popular culture
The 1992 film Kuffs, starring Christian Slater, details the fictional story of a Patrol Special who takes over his late brother's patrol district and comes into conflict with a criminal businessman. A novel written by John Lescroart, The First Law, also weaves a story line around the Patrol Specials.

See also
 Security police
 Illinois Police Reserves

References

External links
San Francisco Patrol Special Police
San Francisco Patrol Special neighborhood policing
San Francisco Patrol Special Information

Law enforcement in the San Francisco Bay Area
San Francisco Police Department